O'Keeffe, also spelled as O'Keefe, Keeffe, Keefe, Kief, Kiefer or King is the name of an Irish Gaelic clan based most prominently in what is today County Cork, particularly around Fermoy and Duhallow. The name comes from caomh, meaning "kind" or "gentle"; some reformed spellings present it as Ó Cuív and the feminine form of the original is Ní Chaoimh. As the primary sept of the Eóganacht Glendamnach, the family were once Kings of Munster from the 6th to the 8th centuries.

Naming conventions

History

The original Caomh, from whom the family descend, lived in the early eleventh century, and was descended from Cathal mac Finguine, celebrated King of Munster and the most powerful Irish king of the first half of the 8th century. See the main article, Eóganachta, for more discussion, as well as Eóganacht Glendamnach, the specific sept of the family.

The O'Keeffes are famous for claiming descent from the goddess Clíodhna and have a beloved story about her marriage to Caomh (Franklin, pp. 81 ff). Her sister Aibell competed for his affections but Clíodhna ultimately triumphed using sorcery.

For all of their history the family has been strongly associated with County Cork. Originally the territory of the family lay along the banks of the Blackwater river, near modern Fermoy, and were active in the wars of the twelfth century between the O'Conors and the Eoghanacht dynasties of Munster.

However, the arrival of the Normans displaced them, like so many others, and they moved west into the barony of Duhallow, where their territory became known, and is still known, as Pobal O'Keeffe, where the senior branch of the family had their seat at Dromagh in Dromtarriff Parish.

The last chiefs of this branch were Domhnall O'Keeffe of Dromagh (d. c. 1655), who was prominent in the Catholic Rebellion of the 1640s, and his son Captain Daniel O'Keeffe, who was killed fighting for King James at the Battle of Aughrim in 1691. The family estates were confiscated in 1703, and sold to the Hollow Blades Company.

Even today, Pobal O'Keeffe is still the area in which the name is most common, with surrounding areas of County Cork also including many of the name. It remains relatively rare outside that county. In 1890, more than two-thirds of the births under the name are recorded in County Cork.

Like many of the dispossessed Irish nobility, the O'Keeffes were active in the service of the Catholic monarchs of Europe. In 1740 Constantine O'Keeffe (born c. 1670) was admitted to the French aristocracy on the basis of his Irish pedigree, and his long service. The bearers of the surname "Cuif", found in the Champagne district of northern France, are descendants of O'Keeffe soldiers.

The original spelling is with two fs (O'Keeffe), and church officials recorded names as they were wrongly spelled, then often resulting in the name of a single person being recorded under several spelling variations, such as O'Keefe, Keefe, Keeffe, Keiffe, and others

Ó Caoimh
 Brian Ó Cuív (Ó Caoimh)
 Éamon Ó Cuív (born 1950), Irish politician

People named O'Keeffe

 Alfred Henry O'Keeffe (1858–1941), New Zealand artist and art teacher
 Batt O'Keeffe, (born 1945), Irish politician
 Ben O'Keeffe, (born 1989), Doctor and New Zealand Professional Rugby Referee
 Bob O'Keeffe (1881–1949), Irish hurler
 Ciarán O'Keeffe (born 1971), English psychologist specialising in parapsychology and forensic psychology
 Corey O'Keeffe (born 1998), footballer
 Daniel O'Keeffe (judge) (born 1943), barrister and Irish High Court judge
 Dan O'Keeffe (1907–1967), Irish footballer 
 Danny O'Keefe (born 1943), American singer-songwriter based in Seattle, Washington
 David O'Keeffe (lawyer), Irish jurist, professor of European law
 David O'Keeffe (footballer) (born 1962), former Australian rules footballer
 Declan O'Keeffe (born 1972), retired Irish footballer
 Denis O'Keeffe, Irish hurler
 Dennis O'Keeffe, British professor of social science
 Eamonn O'Keefe, (born 1953) English-born Irish former footballer
 Eileen O'Keeffe (born 1981), Irish former international hammer and discus thrower
 Eoin O'Keeffe (born 1979), Irish composer based in the UK
 Frank O'Keeffe (1896–1924), Australian cricketer
 Georgia O'Keeffe (1887–1986), American artist
 Ger O'Keeffe (born 1952), retired Irish footballer
 Hank O'Keeffe (1923–2011), American basketball player
 Irene O'Keeffe, Irish camogie player
 Jessy Keeffe (born 1996), Australian rules footballer
 James O'Keeffe (1912–1986), Irish Fine Gael politician
 Jim O'Keeffe (born 1941), Irish politician
 Jonathan O'Keeffe (born 1977), birth name of Irish actor Jonathan Rhys Meyers
 Kain O'Keeffe (born 1987), Australian actor
 Kerry O'Keeffe (born 1949), Australian cricketer and sports commentator
 Kevin O'Keeffe (footballer) (born 1952), former Australian rules footballer
 Kristin Bair O'Keeffe (born 1966) American novelist
 Lachlan Keeffe (born 1990), Australian rules footballer
 Laurence O'Keeffe (1931–2003), British diplomat, ambassador to Czechoslovakia during the 'Velvet Revolution'
 Miles O'Keeffe (born 1954), American actor
 Molly O'Keefe (born 1986), American author
 Natasha O'Keeffe (born 1986), English actress
 Ned O'Keeffe (born 1942), Irish politician
 Paddy O'Keeffe (born 1864), Irish hurler
 Padraig O'Keeffe (1887–1963), Irish traditional musician
 Pat O'Keeffe (1883–1960), English boxer
 Patrick O'Keeffe (politician) (died 1973), Irish politician
 Patrick O'Keeffe (writer) (born 1964), Irish-American short story writer
 Peggy O'Keefe (1928-2019), Australian-Scottish pianist
 Rhys O'Keeffe (born 1990), Australian rules footballer
 Sean O'Keeffe (born 1982), Australian rules footballer
 Susan O'Keeffe, Irish politician and journalist
 Timothy O'Keeffe (1926–1994), Irish editor and publisher
 Trevor O'Keeffe (1968–1987), Irish man who was murdered while hitchhiking in France

Fictional characters

See also
 Clídna
 Eóganachta
 Eóganacht Glendamnach
 His Majesty O'Keefe, a 1954 adventure film, as well as the 1952 book of the same name, from which the film derives
 Irish nobility
 Irish royal families

References

Footnotes

Bibliography
 Byrne, Francis J., Irish Kings and High-Kings. Four Courts Press. 2nd edition, 2001.
 Charles-Edwards, Thomas M., Early Christian Ireland. Cambridge University Press. 2000.
 Franklin, D., "Cliodhna, the Queen of the Fairies of South Munster", in Journal of the Cork Historical and Archaeological Society, Volume III, Second Series. 1897. pp. 81 ff
 MacLysaght, Edward, Irish Families: Their Names, Arms and Origins. Irish Academic Press. 4th edition, 1998.

External links
O'Keefe Clan at OKeefeClan.org
O'Keeffe at the Irish Times
O'Keeffe family pedigree at Library Ireland

Surnames
Ancient Irish dynasties
Clíodhna
Aibell
Anglicised Irish-language surnames